John Plowden Carrington (1941–2022) was a journalist, financier and horse-racing enthusiast.

References

1941 births
2022 deaths
Alumni of the University of Cambridge
People educated at Winchester College
People from Stafford